Evans, Clark and Wollatt was an architectural practice based in Nottingham from the early 1920s to 1948.

History

The practice was established by Robert Evans, John Thomas Clark and John Woollatt by 1921. Robert Evans died in 1927, and John Thomas Clark retired in 1940.

In 1948 the practice changed its name and became Evans, Cartwright and Woollatt until 1961 when it was Cartwright, Woollatt and Partners.

Works
Fairholme, Lenton Road, Nottingham, 1922 additions
12 Elm Avenue, St John's Grove, Beeston 1922
Barclays Bank, 2 Chilwell Road, Beeston 1922
Commercial Union Offices, 10 High Street, Nottingham 1922
Bromley House Library, Angel Row 1929  new doorway and frontage
Greyfriars Hall Greyfriar Gate, Nottingham 1929
St Peter's Church, Nottingham 1930 restoration of the south clerestory and south aisle
Nottingham General Hospital 1931 New operating theatre and children’s ward
Victory Club, Station Road, Beeston 1935
Player Hall, Nottingham High School 1935-36
St Peter's Church, Nottingham 1936 new vestry
Ormiston House, Pelham Street, Nottingham 1937 additions
Beeston Town Hall 1936-38 (built by Hofton and Son)
Nottingham General Hospital 1942 Two new wards

References

Architecture firms based in Nottingham
Architects from Nottingham